Mehwish Sultana (born 30 August 1980) is a Pakistani politician who was a Member of the Provincial Assembly of the Punjab, from May 2013 to May 2018.

Early life and education
She was born on 30 August 1980 in Chakwal.

She earned the degree of Master of Business Administration in Information Technology 2003 from Pir Mehr Ali Shah Arid Agriculture University.

Political career

She was elected to the Provincial Assembly of the Punjab as a candidate of Pakistan Muslim League (N) (PML-N) on a reserved seat for women in 2013 Pakistani general election.

In December 2013, he was appointed as Parliamentary Secretary for higher education.

She was re-elected to the Provincial Assembly of the Punjab as a candidate of PML-N on a reserved seat for women in 2018 Pakistani general election.

References

Living people
Punjab MPAs 2013–2018
Women members of the Provincial Assembly of the Punjab
1980 births
Pakistan Muslim League (N) MPAs (Punjab)
21st-century Pakistani women politicians